Massacre of the Telal occurred in 1517 when Ottoman Turks fully take control of Syria at the end of Ottoman-Mamluk war. The massacre began with the firman issued by newly declared caliph named Selim I, about the massacring of the indigenous Alawite population of Aleppo. Massacre resulted in deaths of 9,400 people.

References 

Massacres committed by the Ottoman Empire
Massacres in 1517